Clarence Eugene "Hooks" Iott (December 3, 1919 – April 17, 1980) was an American professional baseball player. The left-handed pitcher, a native of Mountain Grove, Missouri, worked in 26 games and 81 innings pitched in Major League Baseball for the St. Louis Browns (1941, 1947) and the New York Giants (1947). He served in the United States Army Air Forces during World War II.

Although Iott pitched only briefly in the Major Leagues, Iott spent 16 seasons playing for 20 different teams in minor league baseball (1938–42; 1946; 1948–57), where he won 175 career games. At Paragould, in the Northeast Arkansas League, he struck out 25 batters in a nine-inning game, and 30 batters in a 15-inning game in 1941.

References

External links

1919 births
1980 deaths
Baseball players from Missouri
Beaumont Exporters players
Beaumont Roughnecks players
Dallas Eagles players
Gainesville Owls players
Havana Sugar Kings players
Hollywood Stars players
Little Rock Travelers players
Major League Baseball pitchers
Memphis Chickasaws players
Meridian Eagles players
Miami Beach Flamingos players
Montgomery Rebels players
New York Giants (NL) players
Oklahoma City Indians players
Paragould Browns players
St. Louis Browns players
St. Petersburg Saints players
San Antonio Missions players
Siloam Springs Travelers players
Toledo Mud Hens players
Topeka Owls players
United States Army Air Forces personnel of World War II
Youngstown Browns players
American expatriate baseball players in Cuba